There are six lines in Belgrade Beovoz City Railway System:

Stara Pazova-Batajnica-Beograd Centar-Pančevo Vojlovica
Ripanj-Resnik-Rakovica-Pančevo Vojlovica
Stara Pazova-Batajnica-Beograd Centar-Rakovica-Resnik-Ripanj
Zemun-Beograd Centar-Rakovica-Valjevo
Nova Pazova-Batajnica-Beograd Centar-Rakovica-Resnik-Mladenovac
Stara Pazova-Batajnica-Beograd Centar-Rakovica-Mala Krsna

List of stations (Note that two lines can have same stations in some parts):

Line 1:
Stara Pazova
Nova Pazova
Batajnica
Zemunsko Polje
Zemun
Tošin Bunar
Novi Beograd
Beograd Centar
Karađorđev park (underground)
Vukov spomenik (underground)
Pančevački most
Krnjača
Sebeš
Ovča
Pančevo Glavna
Pančevo Varoš
Pančevo Strelište
Pančevo Vojlovica

Line 2:
Ripanj
Ripanj Kolonija
Pinosava
Resnik
Kijevo
Kneževac
Rakovica
Karađorđev park (underground)
Vukov spomenik (underground)
Pančevački most
Krnjača
Sebeš
Ovča
Pančevo Glavna
Pančevo Varoš
Pančevo Strelište
Pančevo Vojlovica

Line 3:
Stara Pazova
Nova Pazova
Batajnica
Zemunsko Polje
Zemun
Tošin Bunar
Novi Beograd
Beograd Centar
Rakovica
Kneževac
Kijevo
Resnik
Pinosava
Ripanj Kolonija
Ripanj

Line 4 (Zemun branch):
Zemun
Tošin Bunar
Novi Beograd
Beograd Centar
merge with Pančevo branch at Rakovica

Line 4 (Pančevo branch):
Pančevo Glavna
Pančevo Varoš
Ovča
Sebeš
Krnjača
Pančevački most
Vukov Spomenik (underground)
Karađorđev park (underground)
Rakovica
Kneževac
Kijevo
Resnik
Bela Reka
Nenadovac
Barajevo
Barajevo Centar
Veliki Borak
Leskovac Kolubarski
Stepojevac
Vreoci
Lazarevac
Lajkovac
Slovac
Mlađevo
Divci
Lukavac Kolubarski
Iverak
Valjevo

Line 5:
Nova Pazova
Batajnica
Zemunsko Polje
Zemun
Tošin Bunar
Novi Beograd
Beograd Centar
Rakovica
Kneževac
Kijevo
Resnik
Pinosava
Ripanj Kolonija
Ripanj
Klenje
Ripanj Tunel
Ralja
Sopot Kosmajski
Vlaško Polje
Mladenovac

Line 6:
Stara Pazova
Nova Pazova
Batajnica
Zemunsko Polje
Zemun
Tošin Bunar
Novi Beograd
Beograd Centar
Rakovica
Jajinci
Beli Potok
Zuce Stajalište
Zuce
Vrčin
Kasapovac
Lipe
Mala Ivanča
Brestovi
Mali Požarevac
Dražanj–Šepšin
Umčari
Živkovac
Vodanj
Kolari
Ralja Smederevska
Mala Krsna

See also
Beovoz
Belgrade Metro

Beovoz
Beovoz